Act 2 is the second album by the progressive bluegrass band The Seldom Scene. The band continues to benefit from all their trademarks: John Starling folkie lead vocals blend with high tenors of John Duffey, completed with Mike Auldridge's third vocals and Dobro solos, plus all that strengthened by Tom Gray's solid bass playing, not to forget Ben Eldridge's banjo and John Duffey's mandolin fancy licks.

Track listing 
 "Last Train from Poor Valley" (Norman Blake) 3:45
 "Gardens and Memories" (John Starling) 2:46
 "Paradise" (John Prine) 2:26
 "Small Exception of Me" (Tony Hatch, Jackie Trent) 3:04
 "Train Leaves Here This Morning" (Gene Clark, Bernie Leadon) 3:07
 "Keep Me From Blowin' Away" (Paul Craft) 2:46
 "Hello Mary Lou" (Cayet Mangiaracina, Gene Pitney) 2:23
 "Lara's Theme" (Maurice Jarre) 1:24
 "I've Lost You" (Earl Scruggs) 2:42
 "The Sweetest Gift" (Benny Cain, Ronnie Bucke) 2:42
 "Reason for Being" (John Duffey, Ann Hill) 3:24
 "Smokin' Hickory" (Ben Eldridge) 2:25
 "House of Gold" (Hank Williams) 3:14

Personnel 
The Seldom Scene
 John Starling – lead vocals, guitar
 John Duffey – mandolin, tenor vocals
 Ben Eldridge – banjo, second guitar, baritone vocals
 Mike Auldridge – Dobro, second guitar, tenor vocals
 Tom Gray – bass, baritone vocals

References

External links 
 Official site

The Seldom Scene albums
1973 albums
Rebel Records albums